Laura Kelly Newton (born Macleod, 27 November 1977) is an English former cricketer who played as a right-handed batter and off break bowler. She appeared in 13 Test matches, 73 WODIs and 3 WT20Is games for the English women's cricket team. She played domestic cricket for Lancashire and Cheshire, Cheshire, Staffordshire, Lancashire and Lancashire Thunder.

Newton was born in Congleton, Cheshire. She made her one-day international debut in 1997 against South Africa and her Test debut in 1999 against India before touring Australia.  She scored one test century and nine one day half centuries and developed over her career from a middle order batsman to an opener.  She took 12 test wickets and 19 in one day internationals, changing bowling styles from medium pace to off spin over time.  She retired from the international game in May 2007, citing the increased pressures of representing her country.

References

External links
 

1977 births
Living people
England women Test cricketers
England women One Day International cricketers
England women Twenty20 International cricketers
Lancashire and Cheshire women cricketers
Cheshire women cricketers
Staffordshire women cricketers
Lancashire women cricketers
Lancashire Thunder cricketers